Wrestling competitions at the 2022 South American Games in Asunción, Paraguay were held between October 12 and 14, 2022 at the Pavilion 3 of SND.

Schedule
The competition schedule is as follows:

Medal summary

Medal table

Medalists

Men's freestyle

Men's Greco-Roman

Women's freestyle

Participation
Twelve nations participated in wrestling of the 2022 South American Games.

References

External links
 Results Book

Wrestling
South American Games
2022